Jeffrey Northrup (April 22, 1966 – July 2, 2021) was a Toronto police officer who was killed in the line of duty shortly after midnight on July 2 while responding to a robbery call in the parking garage below City Hall near Queen and Bay streets in Toronto. He had 31 years of service with the Toronto Police Service. He lived in Brampton, Ontario and is survived by his wife, three children and his mother. His funeral service took place on July 12, 2021, at BMO Field. Funeral attendees included Ontario Premier Doug Ford and Toronto Mayor John Tory.

Honours 
The City of Brampton named a park after Northrup on April 25, 2022.

References 

1966 births
2021 deaths
Toronto police officers